Beacon Hill (sometimes stylized Beacon Hill the Series) is a soap opera web series that premiered on March 5, 2014 at Beaconhilltheseries.com. Created by Linda Hill and Jessica Hill and executive produced by Crystal Chappell, season one stars Alicia Minshew and Sarah Brown as ex-lovers caught up in political and family drama in the affluent Boston neighborhood of Beacon Hill. Both roles were recast for season two with Nadia Bjorlin and Marem Hessler respectively.

The series was nominated for a 2015 Daytime Emmy Award for Outstanding New Approaches Drama Series, and both Minshew and Brown were nominated for Daytime Emmys for Outstanding Performer in a New Approaches Drama Series the same year. Brown won a 2015 Indie Series Award for Best Lead Actress (Drama) for her role, and Chappell was nominated for an Indie Series Award for Best Supporting Actress (Drama).

Season 2 aired in 2020 for 6 episodes.

Plot
New York City reporter Sara Preston returns home to Beacon Hill to find her senator grandfather ailing, the rest of her family in shambles and her ex-girlfriend Kate Wesley caught up in political drama.

Cast
 Alicia Minshew (season 1) and Nadia Bjorlin (season 2) as New York City reporter Sara Preston
 Sarah Brown (season 1) and Marem Hassler (season 2) as Massachusetts State Representative Katherine "Kate" Wesley
 Ron Raines as Senator William Preston, Sara's grandfather, a longtime Democratic senator for Massachusetts who will stop at nothing to get what he wants 
 Scott Bryce as Senator Tom Wesley, Katherine's father, a conservative Republican senator 
 Crystal Chappell as Claire Preston, Sara's mother, an alcoholic
 John-Paul Lavoisier as Eric Preston, Sara's brother
 Melissa Archer as Evelyn Preston, William's wife
 Jessica Morris as Diane Hamilton, Sara's partner, an actress
 Louise Sorel as coffeehouse owner Emily Tanner
 Tina Sloan as coffeehouse owner Louise Cassell
 Ricky Paull Goldin as Andrew Miller, Katherine's chief of staff
 Rebecca Mozo as Laura Parker, Katherine's best friend

Production
Created by Linda Hill and Jessica Hill, Beacon Hill is executive produced by veteran actress and producer Chappell, with Co-Executive Producer Christa Morris, Supervising Producer Hillary B. Smith and producers Goldin, Hill and Hill. Albert Alarr directed season 1, with Kevin Perry as director of photography and Paul F. Antonelli as music supervisor.

Awards
Beacon Hill was nominated for a 2015 Daytime Emmy Award for Outstanding New Approaches Drama Series, and both Minshew and Brown were nominated for Daytime Emmys for Outstanding Performer in a New Approaches Drama Series the same year. Brown won a 2015 Indie Series Award for Best Lead Actress (Drama) for her role, and Chappell was nominated for an Indie Series Award for Best Supporting Actress (Drama).

References

External links
 
 
 
 
 

2014 web series debuts
2010s American drama television series
2010s American LGBT-related drama television series
American LGBT-related web series
American drama web series
Internet soap operas
Television shows set in Boston
Political web series